Västgötska is a Swedish dialect spoken in the western Swedish province of Västergötland. Specifically, Västgötska commonly refers to several variants of the more broadly defined Götamål spoken across Västergötland except for Gothenburg where the Gothenburg dialect is spoken.

External links 
 Listen to Västergötland dialects

References

Swedish dialects
Västergötland